Geoffrey Rush is an Australian actor of the stage and screen. He has received what is known as the Triple Crown of Acting, meaning an Academy Award, Tony Award and Emmy Award, which represent film, theatre and television respectively. Over his career he has also received three British Academy Film Awards, two Golden Globe Awards, and four Screen Actors Guild Awards. Rush is the founding president of the Australian Academy of Cinema and Television Arts and was named the 2012 Australian of the Year.

Rush received his Oscar for his performance in Shine in 1996. He has received three other nominations for his roles in Shakespeare in Love (1998), Quills (2000), and The King's Speech (2010). For his work in television he received the Primetime Emmy Award for Outstanding Actor in a Limited Series or Television Movie for his performance as Peter Sellers in The Life and Death of Peter Sellers (2003). Rush received his Tony Award for Best Actor in a Play for his performance in the French absurdist comedy Exit the King (2009).

Triple Crown of Acting

Academy Awards

Emmy Award

Tony Award

Major associations

Australian Academy Film Awards

British Academy Film Awards

Golden Globe Awards

Screen Actors Guild Awards

Theatre Awards

Drama Desk Award

Outer Critics Circle Award

Helpmann Award

Other associations

Annie Awards

Mo Awards
The Australian Entertainment Mo Awards (commonly known informally as the Mo Awards), were annual Australian entertainment industry awards. They recognise achievements in live entertainment in Australia from 1975 to 2016. Geoffrey Rush won one award in that time.
 (wins only)
|-
| 2006
| Geoffrey Rush
| Actor in Play
| 
|-

References

External links

 
 
 Geoffrey Rush – Stage acting credits
 Professional photographs of Geoffrey Rush – National Library of Australia

Lists of awards received by Australian actor